Daniel Moratelli (born 17 September 1961 in Juvisy-sur-Orge) is a French curler.

He participated in the demonstration curling events at the 1992 Winter Olympics, where the French men's team finished in sixth place.

Teams

References

External links

Living people
1961 births
People from Juvisy-sur-Orge
French male curlers

Curlers at the 1992 Winter Olympics
Olympic curlers of France